Schmetterling is a surname. Notable people with the surname include:

Elisabeth Barbara Schmetterling (1801–1882), Dutch artist
Lauren Schmetterling (born 1988), American rower

Schmetterling may also refer to:

 Henschel Hs 117 Schmetterling, a surface-to-air missile developed during World War II